Plagiognathus longipennis is a species in the family Miridae ("plant bugs"), in the order Hemiptera ("true bugs, cicadas, hoppers, aphids and allies").
It is found in North America.

References

Further reading
 
 Henry, Thomas J., and Richard C. Froeschner, eds. (1988). Catalog of the Heteroptera, or True Bugs, of Canada and the Continental United States, xix + 958.
 Schuh, Randall T. (2001). "Revision of New World Plagiognathus Fieber, with comments on the Palearctic fauna and the description of a new genus (Heteroptera: Miridae: Phylinae)". Bulletin of the American Museum of Natural History, no. 266, 267.
 Thomas J. Henry, Richard C. Froeschner. (1988). Catalog of the Heteroptera, True Bugs of Canada and the Continental United States. Brill Academic Publishers.

Plagiognathus
Insects described in 1895